Southrepps Common is a  biological Site of Special Scientific Interest north of North Walsham in Norfolk. It is owned by Southrepps Parish Council and managed by Southrepps Common  Group. It is part of the Norfolk Valley Fens Special Area of Conservation.

This is damp grassland and fen in the valley of the River Ant. There are several rare true flies characteristic of undisturbed wetlands, especially Pteromicra glabricula and Colobaea distincta, both of which have larvae which are parasitic on snails.

The site is open to the public

References

Local Nature Reserves in Norfolk 
Special Areas of Conservation in England
Sites of Special Scientific Interest in Norfolk